Rotherham Grammar School was a boys' grammar school in Rotherham, South Yorkshire, England.

History
In 1482 Thomas Rotherham founded the College of Jesus in Rotherham, which was both a School and a religious institution. In March 1482 he began to build a brick building to house his college, on the site of his birthplace in Brookgate, and provided an endowment to fund a Provost and three Fellows. The College was expropriated about 1550 by King Edward VI, but was later re-founded as Rotherham Grammar School, taking the foundation by Rotherham as its origin. The school occupied a number of buildings in Rotherham before moving into a former ministers' training college on Moorgate Road in 1890. In 1967, the local education authority introduced comprehensive education in Rotherham, and the school was closed. Its buildings became a coeducational sixth form college, known as Thomas Rotherham College, which retains the old grammar school's coat of arms in its logo.

Provosts' schoolmasters
source:
 Edmund Carter, 1482–1483
 John Bockyng, 1483 (died in office)
 John More, from 1501
 Robert Collier, from 1508
 Richard Bradshaw, 1524–1525
 William Drapour, from 1535
 Thomas Snell, from 1548

Masters and Headmasters
source:
 William Beck, 1566–1567
 Thomas Woodhouse, from 1568
 Robert Sanderson, from 1583
 Smith, from 1616
 Barrow, from 1620
 Bonner, ????–????
 Charles Hoole Rayte, from 1633
 Graunt, ????-????
 Barton, ????
 Withers, from 1704
 Rev. Christopher Stevenson, from 1725
 Rev. Davis Pennell, from 1746
 John Russell, from 1763
 Tennant, from 1776
 Rev. Richard U. Burton, from 1780
 Rev. Benjamin Birkett, from 1810
 Rev. Joshua Nalson, from 1839
 Edwin A. Fewtrell, from 1841
 R. A. Long-Phillips, from 1863
 Rev. John J. Christie, from 1864
 Rev. George Ohlson, from 1878
 Rev. Thos. Granger Hutt, from 1883
 Rev. Hargreaves Heap, from 1884
 W. A. Barron, from 1919
 Frederick William Field, from 1924
 Gilbert E. Gunner, 1949–August 1966
 Mr Arthur Prust, September 1966–August 1967 (continued as principal of Thomas Rotherham College)

Notable pupils
 Bishop Robert Sanderson (1587–1663), moderator of the 1661 Savoy Conference.  Two of the prayers in the Church of England's Book of Common Prayer have often been attributed to Sanderson.  These are the "general thanksgiving" and the "prayer for all conditions of men".
 Herbert Austin, 1st Baron Austin - founded the Austin Motor Company, and Conservative MP from 1918-24 for Birmingham King's Norton
 Sir Donald Bailey - inventor of the Bailey bridge.
 Prof Robert Auty, Professor of Comparative Slavonic Philology from 1965-78 at the University of Oxford, and President from 1964 to 1967 of the British University Association of Slavists (became the British Association for Slavonic and East European Studies in 1989)
 Prof George Bentley, Professor of Orthopaedic Surgery from 1982-2002 at the University College London Medical School
 Sidney Brazier, bomb-disposal expert
 Stanley Crowther, Labour MP from 1976-92 for Rotherham
 Sir Liam Donaldson, Chief Medical Officer from 1998-2010
 Alfred Goldstein CBE, civil engineer, responsible for designing the M23, the Belfast Transportation Plan, Clifton Bridge (A52) in Nottingham, Winthorpe Bridge (A1) at Newark, the Itchen Bridge in Southampton, and the Elizabeth Bridge in Cambridge
 George Charles Gray, organist
 John Harris (novelist)
 Robert Jenkins CBE, President from 1951-3 and 1973-5 of The Welding Institute
 Walter Jenkins, Vice Chancellor from 1953-8 of the University of Dhaka
 Prof Harry Kay CBE, Vice Chancellor from 1973-84 of the University of Exeter, Professor of Psychology from 1960-73 at the University of Sheffield, and President from 1971-2 of the British Psychological Society
 Donald McWhinnie, theatre director
 John Rose (chemist),
 Sgt. Ian McKay, VC, Falklands campaign.(RGS 1964-1969)
 Prof John Brooks, Professor of Food Microbiology from 2007-2014 at Auckland University of Technology, New Zealand
 Prof. Alan Hedge, Professor of Human Factors and Ergonomics from 1987-2019 at Cornell University, Ithaca, USA.

References

Defunct schools in Rotherham
1483 establishments in England